Odostomia turrita is a species of sea snail, a marine gastropod mollusc in the family Pyramidellidae, the pyrams and their allies.

Description
The shell grows to a length of 2 mm – 3.5 mm. The shell is solid, semitransparent, and glossy. Its color is yellowish white or whitish, with a dark border below the suture The teleoconch contains 5–6 whorls. It is microscopically spirally striate. The periphery is obtusely keeled. The suture is narrow but distinct. There is no umbilicus. The columellar tooth is small, not prominent.

Distribution
This species occurs in the following locations:
 Belgian Exclusive Economic Zone
 British Isles
 English Channel
 European waters (ERMS scope)
 Goote Bank
 Irish Exclusive economic Zone
 Spanish Exclusive Economic Zone
 United Kingdom Exclusive Economic Zone
 Wimereux
 in the Mediterranean Sea off Greece
 in the Atlantic Ocean off the Azores, Madeira, Tenerife  and West Africa.

References

External links
 To Biodiversity Heritage Library (46 publications)
 To CLEMAM
 To Encyclopedia of Life
 To GenBank
 To Marine Species Identification Portal
 To World Register of Marine Species
 

turrita
Gastropods described in 1844